The Auckland New Zealand Temple is a temple of the Church of Jesus Christ of Latter-day Saints (LDS Church) under construction in the suburb of Goodwood Heights outside Manukau Central in Auckland, New Zealand.

History 
The intent to construct the temple was announced by church president Russell M. Nelson on October 7, 2018. The Auckland New Zealand Temple was announced concurrently with 11 other temples. At the time, the number of the church's total number of operating or announced temples was 201 with this announcement.

On June 13, 2020, a groundbreaking to signify beginning of construction was held, with Ian S. Ardern, who is the president of the church's Pacific Area, presiding.

See also 

 Comparison of temples of The Church of Jesus Christ of Latter-day Saints
 List of temples of The Church of Jesus Christ of Latter-day Saints
 List of temples of The Church of Jesus Christ of Latter-day Saints by geographic region
 Temple architecture (Latter-day Saints)

References

External links
Church Newsroom of The Church of Jesus Christ of Latter-day Saints
Auckland New Zealand Temple at ChurchofJesusChristTemples.org

21st-century Latter Day Saint temples
Churches in Auckland
Temples (LDS Church) in Oceania
Proposed buildings and structures in New Zealand
Proposed religious buildings and structures of the Church of Jesus Christ of Latter-day Saints
The Church of Jesus Christ of Latter-day Saints in New Zealand